Anjana Sultana is a retired Bangladeshi film actress. She won Bangladesh National Film Award for Best Actress for her role in the film Parineeta (1986).

Early life and career
Sultana was born and grew up in Dhaka. She made her acting debut in the film Shetu. Her first released film was Shamsuddin Togor directed Doshshu Bonhur (1976). She got her breakthrough in the film Matir Maya (1976). Her fifth film was Ashikkhito (1978).

Personal life
Sultana has a son, Moni. She served as the vice president of Manash, an anti-smoking organisation.

References

External links
 

 

Living people
Bangladeshi film actresses
Best Actress National Film Awards (Bangladesh) winners
Year of birth missing (living people)
Best Actress Bachsas Award winners